Elvedin Beganović  (born 7 November 1971) is a Bosnian professional football manager and former player.

Club career
During his career, Beganović played for several clubs in Europe, which were Čelik Zenica, Remscheid, Đerzelez, Sarajevo, Erzurumspor and Travnik. While playing for Sarajevo, he won the Bosnian Cup twice and the Bosnian Supercup once. 

Beganović retired from active football in 2007 at the age of 36, while playing for Čelik.

International career
Beganović made his debut for Bosnia and Herzegovina in an August 1997 FIFA World Cup qualification match against Denmark and has earned a total of 3 caps, scoring no goals. His final international was an April 2002 friendly game against Croatia.

Managerial career
On 5 January 2011, Beganović received his UEFA Pro Licence in the Football Association of Bosnia and Herzegovina's educational facility in Jablanica, Bosnia and Herzegovina.

In his career, Beganović has managed Čelik Zenica on several occasions, Travnik, Mladost Doboj Kakanj and Rudar Kakanj.

In July 2018, he became the new assistant manager at Mladost, but after manager Adnan Zildžović left the club due to bad results, Beganović was named caretaker manager of Mladost until the end of the 2018–19 season. On 6 June 2019, it was announced that he got the job permanently after a meeting with the club's board of directors.

On 10 September 2019, Mladost announced that former club manager Ibrahim Rahimić came back to the club and became its new manager, but also stated that Beganović will stay at the club as Rahimić's assistant. After Rahimić was sacked, Beganović stayed as assistant to new manager Fahrudin Šolbić. In August 2020, he was once again caretaker manager of Mladost.

Honours

Player
Sarajevo
Bosnian Cup: 1996–97, 1997–98
Bosnian Supercup: 1997

References

External links

1971 births
Living people
Sportspeople from Zenica
Association football defenders
Yugoslav footballers
Bosnia and Herzegovina footballers
Bosnia and Herzegovina international footballers
NK Čelik Zenica players
VfB Remscheid players
FK Sarajevo players
Erzurumspor footballers
NK Travnik players 
Yugoslav First League players 
Yugoslav Second League players
Süper Lig players
Premier League of Bosnia and Herzegovina players
Bosnia and Herzegovina expatriate footballers
Expatriate footballers in Germany
Bosnia and Herzegovina expatriate sportspeople in Germany
Expatriate footballers in Turkey
Bosnia and Herzegovina expatriate sportspeople in Turkey
Bosnia and Herzegovina football managers
NK Čelik Zenica managers 
NK Travnik managers
FK Mladost Doboj Kakanj managers
FK Rudar Kakanj managers
Premier League of Bosnia and Herzegovina managers